Aytmembetovo (Ayıtmämbät) is a rural locality (a village) in Uzunlarovsky Selsoviet, Arkhangelsky District, Bashkortostan, Russia. The population was 310 as of 2010. There are 5 streets.

Geography 
Aytmembetovo is located 30 km northeast of Arkhangelskoye (the district's administrative centre) by road. Azovo is the nearest rural locality.

References 

Rural localities in Arkhangelsky District